Jounama, New South Wales is a rural locality in the Snowy Mountains of New South wales and a civil Parish of the Buccleuch County.

Jounama is in the Snowy Mountains National Park on Jounama Creek and the Snowy Mountains Highway, 15 kilometers south west of Canberra, Australia.

Climate

References

Parishes of Buccleuch County
Localities in New South Wales
Geography of New South Wales